Kumbha Ram Arya (10 May 1914 – 26 October 1995) was a freedom fighter, parliamentarian, and one of the popular leader of farmers in Rajasthan, India. Shri Kumbha Ram Arya was a member of Seventh Lok Sabha during 1980–84 representing Sikar Parliamentary constituency of Rajasthan. Earlier, he was a member of Rajya Sabha during 1960–64 and 1969–74.

References

External links
From Parliament Records

Indian cooperative organizers
Indian independence activists from Rajasthan
1914 births
1995 deaths
Rajasthani politicians
India MPs 1980–1984
Lok Sabha members from Rajasthan
People from Patiala district
People from Sikar
Rajya Sabha members from Rajasthan
Lok Dal politicians
Janata Party (Secular) politicians
Janata Party politicians